Butyl methacrylate is the organic compound with the formula C4H9O2CC(CH3)=CH2. A colorless liquid, it is a common monomer for the preparation of methacrylate polymers. It is typically polymerized under free-radical conditions.

Health hazards
In terms of the acute toxicity of butyl methacrylate, the LD50 is 20 g/kg (oral, rat). It is an irritant to the eyes and can cause blindness.

See also
 Methacrylic acid
 Methyl methacrylate

References

Methacrylate esters
Monomers
Commodity chemicals
Butyl compounds